Jirov may refer to:

 Zhirov, a Russian surname
 Jírov, traditional Czech name for a location in the Czech Republic that was also historically called Jurau in German
 Jirov, a village in Corcova, Mehedinți County, Romania